The 1975 NBA All-Star Game was an exhibition basketball game that was played on January 14, 1975, in Phoenix, Arizona at the Arizona Veterans Memorial Coliseum. It was the 25th edition of the event. The East won the game 108–102. The MVP of the game was Walt Frazier, who scored 30 points.

Coaches: East: K.C. Jones, West: Al Attles.

Eastern Conference

Western Conference

Score by periods
 
 Halftime – East, 51–46
 Third Quarter – East, 83–73
 Officials: Mendy Rudolph and Jerry Loeber
 Attendance: 12,885.

References
 
 

National Basketball Association All-Star Game
All-Star
NBA All-Star Game
Events in Phoenix, Arizona